"Stop, or My Dog Will Shoot!" is the twentieth episode of the eighteenth season of the American animated television series The Simpsons. It first aired on the Fox network in the United States on May 13, 2007. When Santa's Little Helper rescues a lost Homer, he becomes a local hero and the Simpsons decide to enroll him in Police Dog Academy, where he is teamed with Lou and they become a crime-busting duo. Bart's excitement quickly vanishes after an incident with a jaded Santa's Little Helper, so to appease Bart's depression after the loss of his dog, Marge agrees to buy him a huge pet snake, which causes a life-threatening situation at Bart and Lisa's school. It was written by John Frink and directed by Matthew Faughnan. Friend of the show Stephen Hawking makes his third guest appearance on the show as himself, while Maurice LaMarche does the voice of the Horn Stuffer. Rudy Giuliani makes a guest voice appearance as himself, although not in the original airing. The fan-favorite song "Freak On a Leash" by metal band
Korn is featured when Santa's Little Helper is trying to find Homer in a cornstalk maze. The episode was nominated for a Writers Guild of America Award.

Plot
Homer, excited about going to Oktoberfest, is disappointed when he discovers that Marge has tricked him and the kids into going to a Harvest Festival which allows no alcohol. While attempting to leave, Homer accidentally leads the family into a cornfield maze. Lisa crafts an escape plan with Tremaux's algorithm, a real life maze-solving method, but Homer is left behind.

Santa's Little Helper is called upon by Bart to find Homer. The dog manages to sniff out Homer and drag him out of the maze. Santa's Little Helper becomes a hero and the Simpsons, persuaded by Chief Wiggum, enroll him in the Springfield Animal Police Academy, where he is teamed with Lou, managing to help fight crime in Springfield.

Santa's Little Helper catches Snake Jailbird who is taken to court, but freed on a technicality. This makes Santa's Little Helper jaded, and when he returns home, he bites Bart on the leg out of frustration. Considering the fact that the pressure from the fight against crime is what led to the dog's actions on Bart, the Simpsons send the dog away to live with Lou. As a replacement, Marge buys Bart an African rock python, which he names Strangles. Bart takes Strangles to show and tell at school, where Strangles escapes into a school lab and unintentionally knocks over beakers of ethanol and nitric acid, mixing both substances and creating a toxic cloud.

Bart, being the only person still stranded in school trying to find Strangles, collapses from the smoke, (remarking "It smells like some chemicals cut one"). Both Santa's Little Helper and Strangles arrive to save Bart, who chooses his faithful dog to save him. Santa's Little Helper goes back to living with the Simpsons. Groundskeeper Willie adopts Strangles, and places him in the fire hose coil.

Production
Rudy Giuliani was originally announced in the official press release as appearing in this episode. As a result, several images of him recording his part as well as a promotional image of him in Simpsonized form, were released. However, his appearance was not included in the final version of the episode. According to executive producer James L. Brooks in an interview with Charlie Rose, the show was not allowed to use Giuliani's appearance because he had become a presidential candidate.

However, Giuliani's appearance is present in the syndicated version of the episode where he gives the commencement address at the police animal academy graduation ceremony. His speech to the trained animals includes a large amount of condescending "animal talk" such as talking about their fluffy tails and stomachs. He also said they should get a treat, prompting Homer to wish someone had said that on his graduation day.

Cultural references

 In Bart's vision, Santa's Little Helper becomes a dog version of RoboCop and shoots down a math book, Jason Voorhees (from Friday the 13th parts 3+) and Pinhead (from Hellraiser).
 Clippy, the Microsoft Word icon appears on the computer at school, when Strangles tries to eat it (it says "You look like you're trying to eat me. Need some help?").
 The title is a reference of the movie Stop! Or My Mom Will Shoot.
 The song "Freak on a Leash" by the American nu metal band Korn can be heard briefly when Santa's Little Helper is looking for Homer in a corn maze.

Reception
Robert Canning of IGN describes the episode as "average", and was only a buildup to next week's 400th episode. Canning says the episode had bright bits, including Stephen Hawking's appearance.

Adam Finley of TV Squad states the episode "fell flat halfway through the middle act, and all of the third".

This episode was nominated for a WGA Award in 2007, but lost to "Kill Gil, Volumes I & II", another episode this season.

References

External links 
 

The Simpsons (season 18) episodes
2007 American television episodes
Television episodes directed by Matthew Faughnan
Police dogs in fiction
Television episodes about mammals